Fenny Stratford is a railway station that serves the Fenny Stratford area of Milton Keynes, Buckinghamshire. It is on the Marston Vale Line that links Bletchley and Bedford, about one mile (1.7 km) east of Bletchley railway station.

This station is one of seven serving the Milton Keynes urban area.

Services
The station is served by London Northwestern Railway's BletchleyBedford local services, calling hourly in each direction Mon-Sat (no Sunday service) Services are run with Class 230 multiple units.

The station can be accessed from both Watling Street (via steps at Stag bridge) and Simpson Road (which is at grade), to the east and west of the station respectively,

History
The station buildings are in a half-timbered Gothic Revival style that had been insisted upon by the 7th Duke of Bedford for stations close to the Woburn Estate. The buildings are now residential and Grade II listed. The passenger line and station are protected here by trap points, but they are sited such that any runaway train caught by it would subsequently crash into the bridge.

The station was originally built with staggered platforms, a wedge-shaped down platform being near the Simpson Road level crossing to the east. The platforms were rebuilt in 1948 so that they faced each other in the conventional side platform arrangement. One platform was taken out of service in the 1960s, as were a number of sidings. Fenny Stratford was reduced to an unstaffed halt in 1968, freight facilities having been withdrawn the previous year. , the station remains unstaffed. All that now remains is one platform and an area of wasteland east of the station, before Simpson Road crossing, which was controlled by a now demolished signal box that was taken out of service in 2004.

Accidents and incidents
Six people in the bus, including the driver, were killed instantly, and four others were seriously injured. The train, however, was undamaged.

Marston Vale line
Fenny Stratford station, in common with others on the Marston Vale Line, is covered by the Marston Vale Community Rail Partnership, which aims to increase use of the line by involving local people and the train companies.

, the line through the station is single track (from Bletchley to just east of the A5, from whence it is double track until just short of ).

Location

The station is on Watling Street near its junction with Aylesbury Street. The nearest post-code is MK2 2XE.

References

Sources

External links

Railway stations in Buckinghamshire
DfT Category F2 stations
Railway stations in Milton Keynes
Grade II listed buildings in Buckinghamshire
Grade II listed railway stations
Former London and North Western Railway stations
Railway stations in Great Britain opened in 1846
Railway stations served by West Midlands Trains
1846 establishments in England
1925 disasters in the United Kingdom
Buildings_and_structures_in_Milton_Keynes
East West Rail